ENAD (Enosis Neon Agiou Dometiou, Union of Youth of Agios Dometios), (Greek: Ε.Ν.Α.Δ.  Ένωσις Νέων Αγίου Δομετίου) is a first division basketball team based in the Agios Dometios district of Nicosia, Cyprus. It was founded in 1937 via the merger of three local sports clubs. Over the years, it has run basketball, football, table tennis and volleyball divisions. However the club is best known for its basketball team which has won 2 championship titles and 1 national cup. It competes in the top basketball division of Cyprus.

Honours

Basketball
Cyprus Basketball Division 1:
Winner (2) 1969, 1990.
Cyprus Men's Basketball Cup: 
Winner (1): 1987
Runner-up (3): 1972, 1985, 1990, 2012
Cyprus Men's Basketball Supercup:
Winner (1): 1987

Roster

Notable players

Football

ENAD Ayiou Dometiou FC is a Cypriot football club based in Ayios Dhometios, Nicosia. Founded in 1957, it played in the second, third and fourth divisions. The team dissolved after 1993 and reactive at 2013.

External links
 Club homepage
 Club profile on Eurobasket.com

References

 
Basketball teams in Cyprus
Sport in Nicosia
Basketball teams established in 1937
1937 establishments in Cyprus